Walter Andrew "Footie" Ockey (January 4, 1920 – December 4, 1971) was a Major League Baseball pitcher who appeared in two games, both in relief, for the New York Giants in 1944. The ,  right-hander was a native of New York City.

Ockey is one of many ballplayers who only appeared in the major leagues during World War II. He made his major league debut on May 3, 1944, in a home game against the Philadelphia Blue Jays at the Polo Grounds. His only other appearance was on May 20 against the St. Louis Cardinals at Sportsman's Park. Totals for his brief career include 1 game finished, 1 earned run allowed in 2 innings pitched, and an ERA of 3.38. Defensively, he recorded 2 assists without making an error. Bill Lee of the Philadelphia Phillies is the only batter Ockey struck out.

Ockey died at the age of 51 in Staten Island, New York.

References

External links 

Major League Baseball pitchers
Baseball players from New York (state)
New York Giants (NL) players
1920 births
1971 deaths
Binghamton Triplets players
Jersey City Giants players
Newark Bears (IL) players
Norfolk Tars players